Michael Sean D'Arcy Murphy (born 4 September 1986) is a New Zealand singer. He was runner-up of New Zealand Idol (NZ Idol) in 2004, behind Ben Lummis, who became his friend over the course of the contest.

After NZ Idol, Michael Murphy had signed to BMG records. Murphy's first single debuted at No. 1 and stayed a while at the top of radio charts. He gained a gold status for No Place to Land, his debut album. He then toured New Zealand, singing to sold-out audiences. With 5star Fallout, Michael toured New Zealand, the U.S. and English pubs. He is now working on his solo project, with multi national management by ACTS Agency.

5star Fallout
In 2006, Murphy joined his 4 former Deadset bandmates to form the band 5star Fallout, with him as the lead singer.

Rent
Murphy appeared in the Theatre Company's production of RENT at the civic theatre in Auckland.

Coca-Cola Christmas in the Park
Murphy performed in the 2010 Christmas in the Park concert in Christchurch on 27 November and in Auckland on 11 December 2010, as one of 3 years performing the Christmas concerts.

Discography

Albums

Singles

References

External links
 IdolBlog – for upcoming Michael appearances, news and photos
 [2012 Blanket Man tribute song created by Leon Mitchell, sung by Michael Murphy, recorded and released by ZM radio https://web.archive.org/web/20120122091733/http://www.zmonline.com/player/ondemand/blanketman-song]

1986 births
Living people
New Zealand Idol participants
New Zealand musicians
New Zealand people of Irish descent
People from Taupō